N2H2 may refer to:

 N2H2, Diazene, a chemical compound
 N2H2 (company), the company which developed the content-control software Bess